Storhove is a neighborhood of Lillehammer, Norway, located  north of the city center. It is the location of a Inland Norway University site, and the Lillehammer offices of the Norwegian Broadcasting Corporation. During the 1994 Winter Olympics, it also hosted the International Broadcasting Center and the Main Press Center.

References

Lillehammer